Paul Andrew Geroski (18 October 1952 – 28 August 2005) was a leading economist in the United Kingdom. Although born in Pleasantville, New York, United States, Geroski studied and spent most of his career in Britain, where he settled permanently in 1975.

Career

Following the completion of a PhD at University of Warwick he joined the Economics Department at University of Southampton as a lecturer. He quickly established a reputation as an excellent teacher who was generous with his time. Initially, he was given the task of teaching mathematics to 1st year students, many of whom had not studied maths at A level. His 'one hour revision lecture' on differentiation for those students at the start of the course was supported by hours of help in his office. He was also well known for teaching partial differentiation with the aid of a borrowed motorcycle helmet. He taught 'Economic Problems of Industry' to second year students. This quickly (in his second year at Southampton) became the most popular optional course run by the department. His good humour, friendliness, willingness to give up his time and sharp mind all contributed to making his courses popular. Many students chose him to supervise their dissertation for the same reasons.

In 1991 he became a professor of economics at the London Business School, later becoming Dean of its MBA programme (1995–98).  The elective course Technology and Competition was amongst the courses he taught. He was a governor of the school from 1999-2001.

In 1998, he became a member of the Monopolies and Mergers Commission, which subsequently was superseded by the Competition Commission.  He became deputy chairman in 2001 and was its chairman from May 2004 until his death.

His research interests were innovation, technical change and determinants of corporate performance.  Geroski's extensive case studies of R&D and innovation challenged the view that subsidies to R&D were justified by positive externalities, or "spillovers".  He found that, when the parties involved were properly specified, almost all gains were captured by them.

Books

Publications
http://econpapers.repec.org/RAS/pge60.htm

References
Obituary in The Guardian
Obituary in The Independent
List of publications 

1952 births
2005 deaths
British economists
Alumni of the University of Warwick
Deaths from cancer in England
Academics of the University of Southampton
Academics of London Business School
People from Pleasantville, New York